Gurnam Singh (born 1917) was an Indian athlete. He competed in the men's high jump at the 1948 Summer Olympics.

References

External links
 

1917 births
Possibly living people
Athletes (track and field) at the 1948 Summer Olympics
Indian male high jumpers
Olympic athletes of India
Place of birth missing
Date of birth missing (living people)